Vedo nudo (internationally released as I See Naked) is a 1969 Italian anthology comedy film directed by Dino Risi. All the episodes have sex as main theme and all star Nino Manfredi, who plays seven different characters. The film represents the last collaboration between Manfredi and Risi, after Operazione San Gennaro and Straziami ma di baci saziami. For this film Manfredi was awarded with a David di Donatello for Best Actor.

Vedo nudo gained a huge commercial success, and was followed by two unofficial sequels, Sessomatto and Sesso e volentieri, both directed by Risi.

Cast 
Nino Manfredi: Cacopardo / Angelo Perfili / Ercole / Voyeur / Phone-technician / Maurizio / Nanni
Sylva Koscina: The Diva
Enrico Maria Salerno: Carlo Alberto Rinaldo
Nerina Montagnani: Old farmer
Véronique Vendell: Manuela
Daniela Giordano: Luisa
Umberto D'Orsi: Federico
Luca Sportelli: Colleague of Ercole

References

External links

1969 films
Italian LGBT-related films
Commedia all'italiana
Films directed by Dino Risi
Films scored by Armando Trovajoli
1969 comedy films
LGBT-related comedy films
1960s Italian films